Homatropine methylbromide (INN; also known as methylhomatropine bromide) is a quaternary ammonium salt of methylhomatropine. It is a peripherally acting anticholinergic medication that inhibits muscarinic acetylcholine receptors and thus the parasympathetic nervous system.  It does not cross the blood–brain barrier. It is used to effectively relieve intestinal spasms and abdominal cramps, without producing the adverse effects of less specific anticholinergics.
It is used, in addition to papaverine, as a component of mild drugs that help "flush" the bile.

Certain preparations of drugs such as hydrocodone are mixed with a small, sub-therapeutic amount of homatropine methylbromide to discourage intentional overdose.

Contraindications
 Untreated glaucoma
 Myasthenia gravis
 Severe heart failure
 Thyrotoxicosis

See also
 Homatropine

References

Muscarinic antagonists
Peripherally selective drugs
Quaternary ammonium compounds
Tropanes